Made In Sea is the third studio album released on January 26, 2006 by South Korean singer Bada. The album represented a new concept for Bada as a singer - whereas her first two albums showed her as very feminine, this time her image changed to a more androgynous look.

The lead single for her third album was a ballad titled "Find The Way", a cover of a popular Japanese song originally by Mika Nakashima. The music video featured her fellow S.E.S. members Eugene and Shoo. The track was not promoted on live music shows.

Although the album initially did poorly, it was given a re-release because of the success of the follow-up single "V.I.P.", which showcased Bada's markedly improved dancing abilities.

Repackage version
The repackage version was released two months after, which includes a CD and DVD.

Track listing (original release)
 Intro
 Find The Way
 Diary
 V.I.P
 Destiny
 Forever Love
 One Step Slower
 Beyond
 Place of Sun
 Like A Shining Star (One Take Version)
 Here I Am Waiting
 V.I.P (Remix by East4A)
 Find The Way (Instrumental)

External links
 Bada's Official Site

2006 albums
Bada (singer) albums